The Myrhorod (Myrhorodska) or Mirgorod, is a lard-type pig breed from Ukraine.

External links
 http://www.fao.org/docrep/009/ah759e/AH759E10.htm

Pig breeds originating in Ukraine
Animal breeds originating in the Soviet Union